Aglaia Coronio (née Ionides; 1834 – 20 August 1906) was a British embroiderer, bookbinder, art collector and patron of the arts. Of Greek descent, she was the elder daughter of businessman and art collector Alexander Constantine Ionides, who had immigrated to London from Constantinople (present day Istanbul) in 1827. Her older brother was Constantine Alexander Ionides (b. 1833); her younger siblings were Luca (b. 1837), Alexandro (b. 1840) and Chariclea (b. 1844). Aglaia became a confidante of William Morris and a friend of Dante Gabriel Rossetti. She and her cousins Marie Spartali Stillman and Maria Zambaco were known among friends as "the Three Graces", after the Charites of Greek mythology (the youngest of whom was also "Aglaia").

On 20 August 1906, the day after the death of her daughter, Coronio died after stabbing herself in the neck and chest with a pair of scissors.

References 

; cited as ODNB

1834 births
1906 suicides
Arts and Crafts movement artists
Bookbinders
British people of Greek descent
British embroiderers
English art collectors
Women art collectors
English philanthropists
Suicides by sharp instrument in England
Women of the Victorian era
19th-century British philanthropists
19th-century English artists
19th-century British women artists